Faran (also Romanized as Farān and Ferān; also known as Harān and Horūn) is a village in Barzavand Rural District, in the Central District of Ardestan County, Isfahan Province, Iran. At the 2006 census, its population was 62, in 21 families.

References 

Populated places in Ardestan County